Stuart Topper is an Australian former professional rugby league footballer who played in Australia.

Playing career
Topper played for the Miranda Magpies before signing with the Cronulla Sharks in 1988. He played in fourteen games in his debut season and scored two tries. Topper remained with the Sharks until 1994, when he joined the Gold Coast Seagulls.

Topper signed with the new Adelaide Rams franchise in 1997 and played in their inaugural match. He played in 14 games for the Rams that season. Topper travelled to the UK playing in Super Leagues world club challenge with the Rams. Topper retired at the end of 1997 season after ten years of professional football.

References

1971 births
Living people
Australian rugby league players
Rugby league halfbacks
Cronulla-Sutherland Sharks players
Gold Coast Chargers players
Adelaide Rams players
Place of birth missing (living people)